The Battle of Baçente was fought on February 2, 1542 when a Portuguese army under Cristóvão da Gama took a hillfort held by Adalite forces in northern Ethiopia. The Portuguese suffered minimal casualties, while the defenders were reportedly all killed.

Queen Seble Wongel (likely justifiably) advised against this attack, arguing that Gama should wait until her son the Emperor Gelawdewos could march north from Shewa and join the Portuguese due to Ahmed Gragn having known of them. However, Gama was concerned that if he marched around this Muslim-held strongpoint, the local peasantry would be disappointed and stop providing supplies for his troops.

After a probing attack to learn the defenders defences, which Queen Sabla Wengel initially mistook for a defeat, Gama ordered an attack from three side directions on the following day. The defenders were annihilated, with negligible losses to the Portuguese. Nine horses and a number of mules were captured, which afterwards proved useful. "As a feat of arms, this capture of notable." A mosque, which had originally been a church before the hillfort was occupied by Imam Ahmad ibn Ibrahim al-Ghazi's men, was reconsecrated as a church and dedicated to "Our Lady of Victory", and mass was celebrated there the next day. The expeditionary force spent the rest of February there, recovering from the battle.

The Portuguese "Baçente" has been identified as referring to Amba Senayt in Haramat by R.S. Whiteway.

References 

Conflicts in 1542
Bacente
1542 in Ethiopia
1542 in the Portuguese Empire
1542 in Africa
Bacente